Oktoberfest Joy is a fountain and sculpture by Jerry Joslin, installed in Mt. Angel, Oregon, United States.

Description and history
The fountain depicts two dancing children; the statues were acquired by the Mt. Angel Chamber of Commerce, which also maintains the fountain and surrounding flower beds. A planning and design document for the proposed Mt. Angel Bavarian District describes the fountain as a "key transportation landmark" and recommended converting the fountain to solar power. In 2018, the Roth Family Foundation granted $10,000 to the city for a 26x18-foot mural by David McDonald depicting Mt. Angel's "iconic" landmarks. The "German inspired" mural shows dancers wearing lederhosen and "ringing" the Oktoberfest Joy fountain.

References

Fountains in Oregon
German-American culture in Oregon
Mt. Angel, Oregon
Outdoor sculptures in Oregon
Sculptures of children in Oregon
Tourist attractions in Marion County, Oregon